Navarretia heterodoxa is a species of flowering plant in the phlox family known by the common name Calistoga pincushionplant. It is endemic to the San Francisco Bay Area in California, where it grows in the serpentine soils of the hills and mountains.

It is a hairy annual herb producing a slender stem up to about 24 centimeters long. It is glandular and emits a skunky scent. The leaves are divided into threadlike or needlelike lobes. The inflorescence is a head of flowers lined with palmate bracts. The flowers are purple and roughly a centimeter long, their corollas divided into five lobes.

External links
Calflora Database: Navarretia heterodoxa (Calistoga navarretia,  Calistoga pincushionplant)
Jepson Manual eFlora (TJM2) treatment of Navarretia heterodoxa
UC Photos gallery — Navarretia heterodoxa

heterodoxa
Endemic flora of California
Natural history of the California chaparral and woodlands
Natural history of the California Coast Ranges
Endemic flora of the San Francisco Bay Area
Flora without expected TNC conservation status